Mad Conductor is an experimental hip hop band fronted by MC Devlin (Chris Tray) and with production by MC Kinney (Dan McKinney).  Their sound mixes hip-hop with a wide array of styles, in a unique and often experimental way.

The band formed in 2005 after Devlin's former band, hardcore outfit No Cash, broke up.  Originally from Center Valley, Pennsylvania, the band relocated to New Orleans in 2008.

In 2012 the band successfully raised funds on Kickstarter to record a full-length album titled MC Rises.

They are currently back in Pennsylvania, recording and releasing new music on a regular basis while keeping up with ongoing gigs in the north east.

Discography

 Mechanical Claw EP (2005)
 Renegade Space Rock (2007)
 Members Only EP (2008)
 Central America EP (2010)
 MC Rises (2013)
 Space Rock Steady EP (2015)

References

American hip hop groups
Musical groups established in 2005